Painted Tepee Peak, or simply Painted Tepee (also Tipi or Teepee) is a mountain located in Glacier National Park in the U.S. state of Montana near the Two Medicine Pass. The summit lies to the south of Two Medicine Lake, and is within view of Grizzly Mountain, Chief Lodgepole Peak, and Mount Rockwell. The mountain lies along the Two Mountain Pass Trail.

See also
 List of mountains in Glacier County, Montana
 List of mountains and mountain ranges of Glacier National Park (U.S.)
 List of trails of Glacier County, Montana

Notes

References

External links

Mountains of Glacier County, Montana
Mountains of Glacier National Park (U.S.)
Mountains of Montana